José Ivaldo Almeida Silva (born 21 February 1997), known as José Ivaldo or Zé Ivaldo, is a Brazilian footballer who plays as a central defender for Athletico Paranaense.

Career statistics

Honours
Athletico Paranaense
Campeonato Paranaense: 2018, 2019, 2020
Copa Sudamericana: 2018

Cruzeiro
Campeonato Brasileiro Série B: 2022

References

External links
 

1997 births
Living people
Sportspeople from Alagoas
Brazilian footballers
Association football defenders
Campeonato Brasileiro Série A players
Campeonato Brasileiro Série B players
Club Athletico Paranaense players
Esporte Clube Vitória players
Cruzeiro Esporte Clube players